The Hypenodinae are a subfamily of moths in the family Erebidae.  Adult moths of most species of this subfamily lack small, simple eyes near the large, compound eyes and have quadrifine (four-veined) hindwing cells.  The micronoctuid moths are an exception because they possess simple eyes and bifine (two-veined) hindwing cells.

Taxonomy
Phylogenetic studies have shown that this subfamily should include the micronoctuid moths as a Micronoctuini tribe.

Genera

Tribe unassigned
Anachrostis Hampson, 1893
Dasyblemma Dyar, 1923
Dyspyralis Warren, 1891
Hypenodes Doubleday, 1850
Luceria Walker, 1859
Parahypenodes Barnes & McDunnough, 1918
Schrankia Hübner, [1825]

Tribe Micronoctuini
 See Micronoctuini for subtribes and genera.

References

 
Moth subfamilies